QLP may refer to:
 Quebec Liberal Party
 Queensland Labor Party